The C. D. Howe Institute is a Canadian nonprofit policy research organization in Toronto, Ontario, Canada. It aims to be distinguished by "research that is nonpartisan, evidence-based, and subject to definitive expert review."  The institute's office is located in the Trader's Bank Building in downtown Toronto.

The C. D. Howe Institute publishes research that is national in scope and hosts events across Canada on a wide variety of issues in economic and social policy.  Its stated mission is "to raise living standards by fostering economically sound public policies."

Institute
The C. D. Howe Institute's origins go back to Montreal in 1958, when a group of prominent business and labour leaders organized the Private Planning Association of Canada (PPAC) to research and promote educational activities on issues related to public economic policy. In 1973, the PPAC's assets and activities became part of the C. D. Howe Memorial Foundation, created in 1961 to memorialize the late Right Honourable Clarence Decatur Howe. The new organization operated as the C. D. Howe Research Institute until 1982, when the Memorial Foundation chose to focus directly on memorializing C. D. Howe; the institute then adopted its current name: the C. D. Howe Institute.

The institute's research has been cited by Liberal, New Democrat and Conservative members of parliament. The media has described the institute as a centrist, right-wing, conservative, non-partisan, think tank. The institute "is happy to publish papers on either side of the ideological line, provided there is data to back it up."  It has been described as having a "deep intellectual grounding to its public-policy approach".

Funding 
The C. D. Howe Institute is a registered Canadian charity, and it accepts donations from individuals, private and public organizations, and charitable foundations. In 2018, 34% of the institute's income was from academic, corporate and individual donations; 23% was from endowments and research grants; and 18% was income from attendee fees and sponsorships.

Since 2016, the Institute has received major gifts and grants from:

Research
The institute publishes over 60 research reports per year. Major areas of policy research are:
 Business Cycle
 Demographics and Immigration
 Education, Skills and Labour Market
 Energy and Natural Resources
 Financial Services and Regulation
 Fiscal and Tax Policy
 Health Policy
 Industry Regulation and Competition Policy
 Innovation and Business Growth
 Monetary Policy
 Public Governance and Accountability
 Public Investments and Infrastructure
 Retirement Saving and Income
 Trade and International Policy
In March 2015, the institute published a review of provincial and Canadian vaccination policies funded through a $197,950 grant from the Public Health Agency of Canada's Immunization Partnership Fund. A follow-up report focused on childhood immunisation was published in April 2017, and an adult report published in April 2018.

In December 2022, the institute published a review of Canada's COVID-19 vaccination campaign in regards to reduction in cases, hospitalizations and deaths.

Events
The institute hosts public policy roundtables and conferences featuring prominent political leaders (including current and former Prime Ministers), Canadian and international policymakers, academics, business leaders and public servants. Over 80 events are held each year.

Awards
Authors of six C. D. Howe Institute publications have won the Doug Purvis Memorial Prize, which is awarded annually by the Canadian Economics Association to the authors of a highly significant written contribution to Canadian economic policy. (The prize was conferred on Institute contributors in 1994, 1995, 2002, 2010, 2012, and 2015.)  A C. D. Howe Institute title received the Donner Prize in 2004 (Institute publications were runners-up in 2001, 2005, and 2011), which is awarded annually by the Donner Canadian Foundation for the best public policy book by a Canadian.

References

External links
 The C. D. Howe Institute
 Policy.ca Profile: C. D. Howe Institute
 Canada Revenue Agency registered charity information database: C. D. Howe Institute
The Canadian Encyclopedia

Political and economic think tanks based in Canada
Charities based in Canada